{{DISPLAYTITLE:Go (H2O album)}}

Go is the title of the fourth album released by H2O. It was released on May 15, 2001. This and the All We Want EP are the only releases the band made with the major label, MCA Records.  The album peaked at #21 on Billboard Top Heatseekers chart in May 2001.

The last track includes a hidden track of "Like a Prayer", a punk rock cover of the song originally by Madonna. This is their second album in a row to have a cover as a hidden track, with the 7 Seconds cover "Not Just Boys Fun" on their last album, F.T.T.W.. H2O shot a video for "Role Model" and performed "Memory Lane" on Late Night with Conan O'Brien.

Track listing
All songs by Todd Morse unless otherwise noted.
 "Role Model" – 3:24
 "Self Reliable" (Rusty Pistachio) – 2:08
 "Well Behaved" – 3:10
 "Out of Debt" (Todd Morse, Rusty Pistachio) – 2:48
 "Memory Lane" (Rusty Pistachio) – 3:27
 "Ripe or Rotting?" – 2:38
 "I Want I Want" – 2:47
 "Songs Remain" – 2:38
 "Forest King" – 2:22
 "Shine the Light" – 2:45
 "Repair" – 2:54
 "Underneath the Flames" (Rusty Pistachio) – 6:41
Contains the hidden track "Like a Prayer" (Madonna)

Personnel
 Toby Morse – vocals
 Todd Morse – guitar, vocals
 Rusty Pistachio – guitar, vocals
 Adam Blake – bass
 Todd Friend – drums

Recorded at Rumbo Studios, Canoga Park, CA. in November and December 2000 and mixed in January 2001

References

H2O (American band) albums
2001 albums
MCA Records albums
Albums produced by Matt Wallace